Oren Lesmeister (born July 7, 1966) is an American politician who has served in the South Dakota House of Representatives from district 28A since 2017.

References

1966 births
Living people
People from Eagle Butte, South Dakota
Democratic Party members of the South Dakota House of Representatives
21st-century American politicians